U. elegans may refer to:
 Udvardya elegans, a jumping spider species endemic to New Guinea
 Uncinia elegans, a flowering plant species found in New Zealand and Tasmania
 Urocitellus elegans, the Wyoming ground squirrel, a rodent species endemic to the United States
 Uta elegans, a side-blotched lizard